The Man Who Never Was is a 1956 British espionage thriller film produced by André Hakim and directed by Ronald Neame. It stars Clifton Webb and Gloria Grahame and features Robert Flemyng, Josephine Griffin and Stephen Boyd. It is based on the book of the same name by Lt. Cmdr. Ewen Montagu and chronicles Operation Mincemeat, a 1943 British intelligence plan to deceive the Axis powers into thinking the Allied invasion of Sicily would take place elsewhere in the Mediterranean.

The Man Who Never Was was entered into the 1956 Cannes Film Festival, and Nigel Balchin's screenplay won the BAFTA for that year.

Plot
In 1943, Royal Navy Lieutenant Commander Ewen Montagu (Clifton Webb) devises a scheme to deceive the Nazis about the impending invasion of Southern Europe. It entails releasing a corpse with a fictional identity off the coast of Spain, where strong currents will carry it ashore near where a known German agent operates. The non-existent Royal Marine courier, Major William Martin, would appear to be a plane crash victim carrying documents about an upcoming Allied invasion of German-occupied Greece, rather than Sicily, the more obvious target. Overcoming the reluctance of high officers, Montagu receives Winston Churchill's approval to execute his plan, known as Operation Mincemeat.

Following a medical expert's advice, Montagu obtains the permission of the deceased's father and procures the body of a man who died of pneumonia, which would give the appearance he had drowned. The corpse is placed in a canister packed with dry ice and transferred to a waiting submarine. The body is released off the Atlantic coast of Spain and washes ashore as intended. Local authorities, observed by German and British consulate staff, identify the body and conduct an autopsy. After the attaché case containing the deceptive documents is returned to London, a forensics expert confirms that the key letter, which describes an Allied invasion of Greece, was cleverly opened, photographed, and resealed.

Hitler is convinced the documents are genuine, though Admiral Wilhelm Canaris, head of the Abwehr, is sceptical. The Germans dispatch to London an Irish spy, Patrick O'Reilly (Stephen Boyd), to investigate. O'Reilly investigates Martin's American "fiancée", Lucy Sherwood (Gloria Grahame), who is the flatmate of Montagu's assistant, Pam (Josephine Griffin). O'Reilly arrives at their flat, posing as Martin's old friend, on the same day Lucy has received news that her real boyfriend was killed in action. Her genuine grief mostly convinces O'Reilly. As a final test, he gives Lucy his north London address, telling her to contact him if she needs anything. He then radios his German contacts that if he does not send another message in an hour he has been arrested. As Montagu, General Coburn (Michael Hordern) of Scotland Yard's Special Branch and police officers are en route to O'Reilly's flat, Montagu realizes why O'Reilly left his address with Lucy and persuades a reluctant Coburn to let O'Reilly go. When no one arrests him, O'Reilly sends a "Martin genuine!" radio message. The Germans then transfer most of their Sicily-based forces to Greece, which helps the Allied invasion of Sicily succeed.

After the war Montagu receives several decorations and awards for his wartime service, including the Order of the British Empire (OBE). He visits Spain and leaves his OBE medal at the grave of Major Martin, "the man who never was".

Cast

 Clifton Webb as Lt. Cmdr. Ewen Montagu
 Gloria Grahame as Lucy Sherwood
 Robert Flemyng as Lt. George Acres
 Josephine Griffin as Pam
 Stephen Boyd as Patrick O'Reilly
 Laurence Naismith as Adm. Cross
 William Russell as Joe (Lucy's fiancé)
 Geoffrey Keen as Gen. Archibald Nye
 Moultrie Kelsall as the Father
 Cyril Cusack as taxi driver
 André Morell as Sir Bernard Spilsbury
 Michael Hordern as Gen. Coburn
 William Squire as submarine commander Bill Jewell
 Allan Cuthbertson as Vice-Admiral
 Miles Malleson as scientist
 Joan Hickson as landlady
 Terence Longdon as Larry
 Gibb McLaughlin as club porter
 Gordon Bell as Customs Officer
 Wolf Frees as Admiral Wilhelm Canaris (uncredited)
 Ewen Montagu as an Air Vice Marshal (uncredited)
 Peter Williams as Admiral Mountbatten (uncredited)

Historical accuracy

Operation Mincemeat involved the acquisition and dressing up of a human cadaver as a "Major William Martin, R.M." and putting it into the sea near Huelva, Spain. Attached to the dead body was a briefcase containing fake letters falsely stating that the Allied attack would be against Sardinia and Greece rather than Sicily, the actual point of invasion. When the body was found, the Spanish Intelligence Service passed copies of the papers to the German Intelligence Service which passed them on to their High Command. The ruse was so successful that the Germans still believed that Sardinia and Greece were the intended objectives weeks after the landings in Sicily had begun.

The exact identity of the "man who never was" has been the centre of controversy since the end of the war. On the one hand, certain accounts claim the true identity of "Major William Martin" was a homeless, alcoholic rat-catcher from Aberbargoed, Wales, Glyndwr Michael, who had died by self-administering a small dose of rat poison. However, in 2002, authors John and Noreen Steele published the non-fictional account of The Secrets of HMS Dasher, about an ill-fated escort carrier that exploded and sank in the Firth of Clyde around the time Operation Mincemeat had commenced. The Steeles argued that "Major Martin's" body was actually that of seaman John Melville, one of the Dasher's casualties. Further, it has been reported that the accuracy of this claim was verified by the Royal Navy in late October 2004, and a memorial service was held for Melville, in which he was celebrated as one whose "memory lives on in the film The Man Who Never Was ... we are gathered here today to remember John Melville as a man who most certainly was." There is some circumstantial evidence that also supports the identity of the body used as being Melville's. But in fact, Professor Denis Smyth, a researcher at the University of Toronto, has counter-argued that Glyndwr Michael was indeed the real "Major Martin". To support his claims, Smyth published the contents of a secret memo and an official report, both authored by Ewen Montagu himself, confirming the Glyndwr Michael story.

Regardless of the identity of Major Martin, Nigel Balchin's script stayed as close to the truth as was convenient, yet the film does fall back on some dramatization. For example, the episode of the Irish spy, O'Reilly, is a complete fabrication. The British Security Service controlled the German spy network in the UK with its Double-Cross System, though this fact was still secret at the time the film was made. Ewen Montagu declared that he was happy with the fictitious incidents which, although they did not happen, might have happened.

During filming, Montagu has a cameo role, that of a Royal Air Force air vice-marshal who has doubts about the feasibility of the proposed plan. It was described by Ben Macintyre as a "surreal" moment when the real Montagu addressed his fictional persona, played by Webb.

Reception
The film earned an estimated $1.1 million in North American receipts in 1956.

The Radio Times wrote, "the picture may appear overly reverent by today's standards. But this is still a crucial wartime spy tale that is well worth watching."

The Goon Show parody
The BBC's radio comedy show, The Goon Show, made a send-up of the story of The Man Who Never Was (based on the book) and incorporated most of the regular Goon Show characters. Written by Spike Milligan and Larry Stephens, the first version of the script formed two-thirds of the episode broadcast on 31 March 1953, before the film's release, with the first third comprising a separate sketch. Like most of these early episodes, this no longer exists.

Milligan and Stephens later wrote a full-length version which was broadcast on 20 March 1956. Milligan later revised this script for the episode broadcast on 17 February 1958. Both of the later versions have been issued on CD sets. Coincidentally, Peter Sellers (one of the Goons) provided the voice of Winston Churchill in the film, although the character did not appear in the Goon Show adaptation.

See also
Operation Mincemeat (film)

References

External links
 
 
 
 
 

Operation Mincemeat
1956 films
1950s spy thriller films
1956 war films
British war films
Films directed by Ronald Neame
Films set in 1943
Films set in Spain
Films set in London
CinemaScope films
Royal Navy in World War II films
World War II spy films
MI5 in fiction
British spy thriller films
Films shot in London
Films shot in Spain
World War II films based on actual events
20th Century Fox films
Films with screenplays by Nigel Balchin
1950s English-language films
1950s British films